Daulocnema is a genus of moths belonging to the family Tortricidae.

Species
Daulocnema epicharis Common, 1965

References

 , 1965, Australian Journal of Zoology 13: 715.
 , 2005, World Catalogue of Insects volume 5 Tortricidae

External links
tortricidae.com

Chlidanotini
Tortricidae genera